Ida Fiyo Mntwana (1903 – March 1960) was a South African anti-apartheid and women's right activist.

Biography 
Mntwana worked as a dressmaker and became active in politics in the 1950s. After Madie Hall Xuma resigned as national president  of African National Congress Women's League (ANCWL) in 1949, Mntwana was her replacement. Mntwana was more radical than her predecessor, organizing women in demonstrations, strikes and other acts of civil disobedience. She was also elected to become one of ANC (Africa National Congress) executive committee

In 1954, Mntwana became the first president of the Federation of South African Women (FEDSAW). She helped organize the Congress of the People. At the second day of the congress, police invaded the congress and incited a conflict between the people and the police. It was Mntwana who calmed the people by singing freedom song from the platform to keep the congress going well.

On 26 August 1952, she led the Germiston march. The group were consist of 29 women: 11 Indian, one Coloured (Susan Naude), and 17 African women. She and the group was detained and sentenced to fourteen days in Boksburg prison. She was also a leader of the FEDSAW march to the Union Buildings in Pretoria on 27 October 1955. Around 2,000 women participated in that march to protest pass laws for women.

Mntwana was one of the defendants in the 1956 Treason Trial. Mntwana died in March 1960 during the treason trial.

Legacy 
Mntwana is represented in one of 100 bronze statues that is part of the National Heritage Monument's project which was called The Long March to Freedom. Her bronze statue was created by Sarah Lovejoy. In August 2000, Mntwana was cited as "torchbearer" during Thabo Mbeki's speech in the unveiling of South Africa's Women's Monument  She earned a posthumous Order for Meritorious Service in 2003.

References 

1903 births
1960 deaths
Anti-apartheid activists
South African women